The Suzuki GR650 is a two-cylinder standard motorcycle built by Suzuki from 1983 to 1989. In the United States it was called the GR650 Tempter, and was only sold there for the 1983 and 1984 model years. Suzuki would later use the `Tempter' name on a version of the ST400 sold in Japan and Europe.

Features 
The GR650 was powered by a four-stroke air-cooled DOHC parallel twin with two valves per cylinder (four valves total). This engine had a 180° crankshaft with a gear-driven counter-balancer and a wet sump. The carburetors were two Mikuni CV BS36SS. To induce swirl in the air-fuel mixture Suzuki added a sub-intake port connecting the carburetor throat to the intake port just above the valve head. Suzuki claimed that this allowed the GR650 to run with a leaner mixture than usual, which improved fuel economy. Two oil jets cooled the pistons at higher engine speeds.

The bike featured a two-stage flywheel which used a centrifugal clutch to disengage a secondary flywheel above 3,000 rpm, effectively lowering the mass of the flywheel. This was intended to dampen vibration and provide easier take-off at low RPM, and improve responsiveness at higher RPM. 

The transmission was a five-speed fully meshed unit that drove the rear wheel through a 15/38 sprocket set and a #630 chain. Rear suspension was Suzuki's Full-Floater progressive mono-shock system.

Models
The GR650 was sold in two levels of trim; the GR650D and the GR650X. The GR650X came with traditional wire spoke wheels, a monochromatic paint scheme, and non-adjustable front forks. The GR650D got a two-tone paint scheme, cast alloy spoke wheels, an auxiliary running lamp under the headlamp and adjustable front air forks.

Reviews and riding impressions
Early reviews drew comparisons between the GR650 and classic British Twins, although some also saw a Cruiser influence. Suzuki's decision to release the bike into a shrinking market for parallel twins was also noted.

Reviewers commented on the bike's light weight (Suzuki called it 450 class) and compact engine package. These qualities, combined with a low center of gravity, produced handling described as "supple" and "easy" and the bike was called "tossable".

The engine's low-end torque was praised, although it was felt that peak power had been sacrificed. Cycle magazine recorded a 0-60 mph time of 5.7 seconds. Reviewers also wrote that at higher RPMs vibration from the engine became more pronounced. The 5-speed transmission was described as smooth and easy-shifting.

In Cycle World's long-term test they remarked on the bike's reliability. The only problems experienced after 14,000 miles was a leaking front shock oil reservoir and front pads that were worn down to metal at 7,400 miles..

References 

GR650 Tempter
Motorcycles introduced in 1983
Standard motorcycles
Motorcycles powered by straight-twin engines